The Portuguese Tennis Federation (Portuguese: Federação Portuguesa de Ténis, FPT) is the national governing body for tennis in Portugal. It is a member of the regional association Tennis Europe and the International Tennis Federation (ITF) and is responsible for the Portugal Davis Cup team and the Portugal Fed Cup team. FPT regulates tennis, padel tennis, wheelchair tennis and beach tennis professional and amateur activities in Portugal, including National Championships.

Organization
The FPT has 13 geographical associations, with more than 300 clubs, and 3 professional associations representing coaches, players and officials.

Tennis Officials Association
Portugal Tennis Players Association
Portuguese Association for Tennis Coaches
Azores Tennis Association
Alentejo Tennis Association
Algarve Tennis Association
Aveiro Tennis Association
Castelo Branco Tennis Association
Coimbra Tennis Association
Leiria Tennis Association
Lisbon Tennis Association
Madeira Tennis Association
Porto Tennis Association
Setúbal Tennis Association
Vila Real Tennis Association
Viseu Tennis Association

History
Without an organization to support a participation at the Davis Cup, a group of players met at Automóvel Club de Portugal headquarters in 1924 to solve the situation. In result, the Lawn Tennis Portuguese Federation was founded on 16 March 1925, with Guilherme Pinto Basto serving as its first President. The first Portuguese Davis Cup team would play later that year. However, it would not be until 1963 under President Herédia that Portugal would have a regular representation at the competition.

Tournaments
Estoril Open (2015–)
Lisbon Open (1983)
Oporto Open (1995–1996)
Porto Open (2001–2002)
Portugal Open (1990–2014)
2000 Tennis Masters Cup

National Championships
The Portuguese Tennis National Championships were first held in 1925 and have been organized ever since by FPT. Under the official name "Campeonato Nacional Absoluto/Taça Guilherme Pinto Basto", the 2014 and 2015 editions were held at CIF – Clube Internacional de Foot-Ball, in Lisbon.

The following list presents Portuguese champions for Singles, Doubles and Mixed tennis competitions.

Presidents
This a comprehensive list of all Presidents of the FPT.

Notes

References

Portugal
Tennis in Portugal
Tennis
Sports organizations established in 1925
1925 establishments in Portugal